Jim or James Lea may refer to:

 Jim Lea (athlete) (1932–2010), American sprinter
 Jim Lea (musician) (born 1949), English bass guitarist
 James Neilson Lea (1815–1884), Louisiana politician and jurist
 James Lea, British architect of James & Lister Lea